Miñnullin Tufan Ğabdulla ulı aka Tufan Miñnullin  (Minnulin Tufan Abdullovich) was a famous Tatar writer, playwright, publicist, Tatarstan State Council deputy and honorary citizen of Kazan. He was a permanent member of State Council of the Republic of Tatarstan (Tatarstan parliament) since 1990. International PEN club member (since 1996).

He was born on 25 August 1935 in a Tatar family in the village of Bolshoe Meretkozino in the Tatarstan’s Kamskoe Ustie region.

Miñnullin died on 2 May 2012.

References

External links 
 Tufan Minnullin in Tatar electronic library

1935 births
2012 deaths
Volga Tatar people
Tatar people of Russia
Tatar writers
Tatar dramatists and playwrights
20th-century dramatists and playwrights